Allium hirtovaginatum is a species of wild onion native to the Mediterranean region, from Morocco and the Balearic Islands to Turkey.

Allium hirtovaginatum produces an egg-shaped bulb. Scape is up to 50 cm, round in cross-section, thin and flexible. Leaves are very thin and hair-like. Umbel has only a few flowers. Flowers bell-shaped, the tepals white with dark purple midvein. Ovary is covered with long hairs.

References

External links
photo of herbarium specimen at Muséum National d'Histoire Naturelle (P), lectotype of Allium hirtovaginatum

hirtovaginatum
Onions
Plants described in 1843